New York's 123rd State Assembly district is one of the 150 districts in the New York State Assembly. It has been represented by Donna Lupardo since 2005.

Geography 
District 123 is entirely within Broome County. It contains the city of Binghamton and the towns of Union and Vestal.

Recent election results

2022

2020

2018

2016

2014

2012

References 

123
Broome County, New York